|}

The Kilboy Estate Stakes is a Group 2 flat horse race in Ireland open to thoroughbred fillies and mares aged three years or older. It is run over a distance of 1 mile and 1 furlong (1,811 metres) at the Curragh in July.

History
The event is sponsored by Kilboy Estate, a stud farm located in Dolla. It was established in 2004, and the first running was won by Tropical Lady.

The Kilboy Estate Stakes initially held Listed status. It was promoted to Group 3 level in 2011, and raised to Group 2 in 2013.

The race is staged during a two-day meeting called Irish Oaks Weekend. It is currently run on the second day, the day after the Irish Oaks.

Records

Most successful horse:
 no horse has won this race more than once

Leading jockey (5 wins):

 Ryan Moore - Latin Love (2010), Dank (2013), Mango Diva (2014), Magical (2018), Lily Pond (2022)

Leading trainer (4 wins):
 Aidan O'Brien - Wedding Vow (2015), Elizabeth Browning (2017), Magical (2018), Lily Pond (2022)

Winners

See also
 Horse racing in Ireland
 List of Irish flat horse races

References

 Racing Post:

 galopp-sieger.de – Kilboy Estate Stakes.
 horseracingintfed.com – International Federation of Horseracing Authorities – Kilboy Estate Stakes (2018).
 pedigreequery.com – Kilboy Estate Stakes – Curragh.

Mile category horse races for fillies and mares
Curragh Racecourse
Flat races in Ireland
2004 establishments in Ireland
Recurring sporting events established in 2004